Varaz or Waraz may refer to:
 Baraz
 Varazq